Stick It may refer to:

Film and TV
Stick It, a 2006 comedy film starring Jeff Bridges and Missy Peregrym.
"Stick It", a 2006 episode of the TV series Boston Legal

Music
Stick It (band), an American rock band from Florida
Stick It (Great White album), a 1984 album by the American rock band, Great White
Stick It (Buddy Rich album), a 1972 album by jazz drummer Buddy Rich

Songs
"Stick It", a song by Chris Rea from the 1980 album, Tennis (album)
"Stick It", a song by Raven from the 1988 album, Nothing Exceeds Like Excess
"Stick it", a song by Keith Anderson from the album, Three Chord Country and American Rock & Roll